Learn to Love may refer to:

"Learn to Love", song by Harry Connick, Jr from To See You
"Learn to Love", song by Leeland from Love Is on the Move, 2009
"Learn to Love", song by Voisper from Voice + Whisper, 2016
Learn to Love (Bon Jovi song) redirect